Parramatta Park is a suburb of Cairns  in the Cairns Region, Queensland, Australia.

Geography 
Parramatta Park is the suburb immediately west of Cairns City (the Cairns central business district). The northern part of the suburb is residential. The southern part of the suburb has a number of schools, the Cairns Showgrounds, Barlow Park (a multi-sports facility and stadium) and an industrial precinct.

History 
Parramatta Park is situated in the Yidinji traditional Aboriginal country.

The origin of the suburb name is from the suburb of Parramatta in the Sydney metropolitan area of New South Wales with a possible derivation from a hotel situated locally during the late nineteenth century.
The estate was promoted as being close to the terminus of the Herberton railway line and as a "paradise of health". To attract buyers from Townsville, there was the inducement of a free return trip to Cairns for buyers of 10 lots.

Parramatta State School was opened on 24 January 1927.

St Joseph's Primary School opened on 1 July 1927 by the Sisters of Mercy. Mercy Sisters were part of the teaching staff of the school until 2015. On Sunday 15 April 1928 Bishop John Heavey officially opened the new Catholic church and school building.

St Augustine's College opened on 9 February 1930 by the Marist Brothers.

On 17 June 1932 the Cairns City Council asked unemployed vagrants living in Parramatta Park, to leave the grounds for the duration of the Cairns show. They refused to go and by July 1932 the town's people were getting frantic and angry because they could not set up for the show. On 17 July 1932 police were called in to forcibly remove the men from the park, many towns people also took part in the hostilities and a riot broke out. A number of people were injured and the majority of the vagrants were “run out of town”.

The Parramatta Park parish of the Roman Catholic Diocese of Cairns was established in 1946.

Heritage listings
 28D Grove Street: Grove Street Pensioners' Cottages

Education 

Parramatta State School is a government primary (Early Childhood-6) school for boys and girls at 122 Mulgrave Road. In 2016, the school had an enrolment of 379 students with 46 teachers (39 full-time equivalent) and 40 non-teaching staff (24 full-time equivalent). In 2018, the school had an enrolment of 316 students with 46 teachers (39 full-time equivalent) and 34 non-teaching staff (20 full-time equivalent). It includes a special education program.

St Joseph's School is a Catholic primary (Prep-6) school for boys and girls at 13 Loeven Street. In 2018, the school had an enrolment of 389 students with 28 teachers (23 full-time equivalent) and 19 non-teaching staff (12 full-time equivalent).

St Augustine's College is a Catholic secondary (7-12) school for boys at 251 Draper Street. In 2018, the school had an enrolment of 748 students with 64 teachers (61 full-time equivalent) and 36 non-teaching staff (31 full-time equivalent). Boarding facilities are available.

There is no government secondary school in Parramatta Park. The nearest government secondary school is Cairns State High School in neighbouring Cairns North to the north-east.

Amenities 
St Joseph's Catholic Church is on the corner of Draper and Loeven Streets. Services are also held in the chapel of St Augustine's College and at Trinity Chapel in Mercy Place aged care facility (formerly Bethlehem Home) in Gatton Street, Westcourt. These are within the Parramatta Park Parish of the Roman Catholic Diocese of Cairns.

The Cairns Showground is at the corner of Severin Street and Mulgrave Road .

References

Attribution 
This article contains material from From the vault – Parramatta Park Riot, Cairns 1932, State of Queensland (Queensland Police Service) 2020, released under CC-BY-2.5 licence (archived 1 December 2020).

Further reading

External links